Nineteen Ninety-Four (Viceroy VIC 8012-2, Reissue: Repertoire REP5191) is a 1994 album by Alvin Lee released in the United States as I Hear You Rockin'.

Track listing
All tracks composed by Alvin Lee; except where noted.
"Keep On Rockin'" - 5:09
"Long Legs" - 6:16
"I Hear You Knockin'" (Dave Bartholomew, Pearl King) - 3:40
"Ain't Nobody's Business" (Alvin Lee, Steve Grant) - 4:11
"The Bluest Blues" - 7:27
"Boogie All Day" - 3:52
"My Baby's Come Back to Me" - 4:58
"Take It Easy" - 6:24
"Play It Like It Used to Be" (Alvin Lee, Tim Hinkley) - 4:01
"Give Me Your Love" (Alvin Lee, Steve Gould) - 5:58
"I Don't Give a Damn" - 5:46
"I Want You (She's So Heavy)" (Lennon–McCartney) - 9:52

Personnel
Alvin Lee - guitar, vocals
Steve Gould - bass
Alan Young - drums
Steve Grant - keyboards
Special Guests 
George Harrison - slide guitar on "The Bluest Blues" and "I Want You (She's So Heavy)" 
Joe Brown - vocals and plectrum banjo on "I Hear You Knockin'" and "Boogie All Day"
Sam Brown and Deena Payne - vocals on "Long Legs" and "Give Me Your Love"
Tim Hinkley - Hammond organ on "The Bluest Blues" and "I Don't Give a Damn"; piano on "Play It Like It Used to Be"

References

Alvin Lee albums
1994 albums
Repertoire Records albums